Duplicate Sholay is a 2002 spoof Hindi film that parodies the 1975 classic Bollywood blockbuster Sholay. It was directed by Kanti Shah and released on 26 April 2002.

Cast
 Sapna as Ram Katori
 Joginder as Sakina 
 Reena Kapoor as Ram Katori
 Mithun Chakraborty
 Arun Mathur as Police Commissioner
 Anil Nagrath as Ajit Singh
 Amit Pachori as Jay / Shahenshah
 Gurbachchan Singh]] as Gurubachan
 Jai Thakur as Jay Thakur
 Vinod Tripathi as Gabbar Singh

References

External links 
 

Sholay
2002 films
Indian parody films
2000s Hindi-language films
Films directed by Kanti Shah